Leptophobia diaguita is a butterfly in the family Pieridae first described by Peter Jörgensen in 1916. It is found in Argentina, Peru and Ecuador.

Subspecies
The following subspecies are recognised:
Leptophobia diaguita diaguita (Argentina)
Leptophobia diaguita latifascia Joicey & Talbot, 1928 (Peru, Ecuador)
Leptophobia diaguita mandor Lamas, 2003 (Peru)

References

Pierini
Butterflies described in 1916
Pieridae of South America